Prosigoj was a Serbian ruler believed to have ruled prior to  830. Serbia was a Slavic principality subject to the Byzantine Empire, located in the western Balkans, bordering with Bulgaria in the east. Mentioned in the De Administrando Imperio (DAI) from the mid-10th century, he succeeded his father Radoslav and was succeeded by his son Vlastimir (r.  830–851).

The son of Radoslav, and grandson of Višeslav, the first Serbian ruler by name, Prosigoj is believed to have ruled some time before  830, or until 835. One of these most likely ruled during the revolt of Ljudevit of the Slavs in Lower Pannonia against the Franks (819–822). According to Einhard's Royal Frankish Annals, Ljudevit fled from his seat at Sisak to the Serbs in 822, with Einhard mentioning the Serbs as a people "which is said to be holding a great part of Dalmatia" (ad Sorabos, quae natio magnam Dalmatiae partem obtinere dicitur) but according to John (Jr.) Fine, it was hard to find Serbs in this area since the Byzantine sources were limited to the southern coast, also it is possible that among other tribes exists tribe of group of small tribes of Serbs. The mentioning of "Dalmatia" in 822 and 833 as an old geographical term by the authors of Frankish Annals was Pars pro toto with a vague perception of what this geographical term actually referred to. At this time, there was still peace with Bulgaria. His son Vlastimir is the eponymous founder of the Vlastimirović dynasty, which ruled until c. 960.

The four named succeeding Serbian rulers are not mentioned in the Chronicle of the Priest of Duklja, a source dating to c. 1300–10 and largely discredited in historiography (the CPD is deemed useless for events in the Early Middle Ages). Instead, the CPD mentions several historically unconfirmed or legendary rulers, Svevlad, Selimir, Vladin and Ratimir, although it maintains the patrilineal succession tradition. According to Sima Lukin Lazić (1863–1904), Prosigoj was dead by the time of a Bulgar attack on Serbia following the Bulgar conquest of Frankish-held Banat and Syrmia.

See also

List of Serbian monarchs

Annotations

References

Sources
Primary sources
 
 
 
 
 

Secondary sources

 
 
 
 
 
 
 
 
 
 

9th-century Serbian monarchs
9th-century rulers in Europe
Vlastimirović dynasty
Slavic warriors